Chitré District is a district (distrito) of Herrera Province in Panama. The population according to the 2000 census was 42,467. The district covers a total area of 91 km². The capital lies at the city of Chitré.

Administrative divisions
Chitré District is divided administratively into the following corregimientos:

Chitré (capital)
La Arena
San Miguel de Monagrillo
Llano Bonito
San Juan Bautista

References

Districts of Panama
Herrera Province